Mohammad Tavasoli (born 15 May 1938) is an Iranian democracy activist and politician. He is the Secretary-General and also the director of the political office of the Freedom Movement party.

Early life
Tavasoli studied at Tehran University in 1956 and was one of the members of Anjoman-e Eslami. He joined the freedom movement soon after it was established. He went to Germany in 1962 to study transportation and traffic. After visiting the United States in 1967, he was returned to Iran and banned from traveling. He was arrested in 1971 because he helped a member of MEK and was jailed for one year. Before the Iranian Revolution, he was one of the staff responsible for the advertising campaign rally to welcome Ruhollah Khomeini back to Iran after 15 years.

Political career
After the Iranian Revolution, he was elected as Mayor of Tehran. He was mayor from February 1979 until February 1980. He was jailed with Hashem Sabbaghian in 1983 but was released seven months later. He was jailed again in March 1988 and after the 2009-2010 Iranian election protests after participating in a rally in June 2009.

References

1938 births
Living people
Islamic democracy activists
University of Tehran alumni
People from Tehran
Iranian revolutionaries
People of the Iranian Revolution
National Front (Iran) student activists
Members of the Association for Defense of Freedom and the Sovereignty of the Iranian Nation
Secretaries-general of the Freedom Movement of Iran
Heads of political office of the Freedom Movement of Iran